Imetelstat (development code GRN163L) is an experimental anticancer drug. The first telomerase inhibitor to enter clinical trials, As of early 2023, it was in Phase 2/3 trials for various cancer types.

Chemically, imetelstat is a synthetic conjugate consisting of three parts: GRN163, a thio phosphoramide oligonucleotide, and a palmitoyl lipid group.  GRN163 is the pharmacological component with telomerase inhibition. The palmitic acid moiety is conjugated via a phosphothioate linkage to the backbone of the antisense oligonucleotide. Telomere shortening and lower cell viability are observed after inhibition of telomerase activity in vitro. IC50 values ranged from 50 to 200nM for 10 different pancreatic cell lines.

References 

Experimental cancer drugs